Ramjas Public School (Day Boarding) is a public school located in Anand Parbat, New Delhi, India. it is a dayboarding school up until ninth grade.

References

Schools in Delhi